Komp or KOMP may refer to:

 Komp (Königswinter), division of Königswinter, Northrhine-Westfalia, Germany
 Komp (Denklingen) and Komp (Eckenhagen), divisions of Reichshof, Northrhine-Westfalia, Germany
 Betty Komp, American politician and member of the Oregon House of Representatives
 KOMP (FM), a radio station (92.3 FM) licensed to Las Vegas, Nevada, United States
 KOMP 104.9 Radio Compa, an album by Akwid
  Knockout Mouse Program (KOMP), part of the International Knockout Mouse Consortium

See also 
 Comp (disambiguation)